The National Prize for Medicine was created in 2001 by the , the Association of Medical Faculties, the Association of Medical Scientific Societies, and the Medical College of Chile.

It is given to recognize the work of those doctors who have excelled among their peers in the area of clinical or public health and, in addition, have had a prominent role in teaching, academic administration, or research.

The prize consists of a diploma, a commemorative medal, and an amount of money that is contributed by the medical community.

It is awarded every two years.

Winners
 2002: Julio Meneghello, surgeon of the University of Chile, pediatrician
 2004: , surgeon of the University of Chile, pediatric heart surgeon
 2006: , surgeon of the University of Chile, internist and gastroenterologist
 2008: , surgeon of the University of Chile, internist
 2010: , surgeon of the University of Chile, internist and gastroenterologist
 2012: Fernando Mönckeberg Barros, medical surgeon of the University of Chile
 2014: , surgeon of the University of Chile, ophthalmologist
 2016: Manuel García de los Ríos Álvarez, surgeon of the University of Concepción, internist and diabetologist
 2018: Otto Dörr Zegers, psychiatrist of the University of Chile

Notes

See also 

 List of medicine awards

References

External links
 Regulations of the National Prize for Medicine 

2001 establishments in Chile
Awards established in 2001
Chilean awards
Medicine in Chile
Medicine awards